Many countries hold national championships for figure skating. These events are conducted to determine the country's national champion and are most often held in December or January. National associations generally use these events as one of the criteria to select the teams for the European, Four Continents, World Junior, and World Championships, in conjunction with the ISU's minimum scores for entries and sometimes federation-announced criteria which may include other minimum scores, international results, and jump requirements.



A
 Australian Figure Skating Championships
 Austrian Figure Skating Championships

B
 Belarusian Figure Skating Championships
 Belgian Figure Skating Championships
 Bulgarian Figure Skating Championships
 Brazilian Figure Skating Championships
 British Figure Skating Championships

C
 Canadian Figure Skating Championships
 Synchro: Canadian Synchronized Skating Championships
 Chinese Figure Skating Championships
 Chinese Taipei Figure Skating Championships
 Croatian Figure Skating Championships
 Czech Figure Skating Championships
 Czechoslovak Figure Skating Championships

D
 Danish Figure Skating Championships
 Dutch Figure Skating Championships

E
 East German Figure Skating Championships
 Estonian Figure Skating Championships

F
 Finnish Figure Skating Championships
 Synchro: Finnish Synchronized Skating Championships
 French Figure Skating Championships

G
 German Figure Skating Championships
 Greek Figure Skating Championships

H
 Hong Kong Figure Skating Championships
 Hungarian Figure Skating Championships

I
 Icelandic Figure Skating Championships
 Indian Figure Skating Championships
 Indonesian Figure Skating Championships
 Irish Figure Skating Championships
 Israeli Figure Skating Championships
 Italian Figure Skating Championships

J
 Japan Figure Skating Championships
 Japan Junior Figure Skating Championships

K
 Kazakhstani Figure Skating Championships

L
 Latvian Figure Skating Championships
 Lithuanian Figure Skating Championships

M
 Macedonian Figure Skating Championships
 Malaysian Figure Skating Championships
 Mexican Figure Skating Championships

N
 Netherlands, see Dutch Figure Skating Championships
 New Zealand Figure Skating Championships
 North Korean Figure Skating Championships
 Norwegian Figure Skating Championships

P
 Philippine Figure Skating Championships
 Polish Figure Skating Championships
 Puerto Rican Figure Skating Championships

R
 Romanian Figure Skating Championships
 Russian Figure Skating Championships
 Russian Junior Figure Skating Championships

S
 Serbian Figure Skating Championships
 Singaporean Figure Skating Championships
 Slovak Figure Skating Championships
 Slovenian Figure Skating Championships
 South African Figure Skating Championships
 South Korean Figure Skating Championships
 Soviet Figure Skating Championships
 Spanish Figure Skating Championships
 Swedish Figure Skating Championships
 Swiss Figure Skating Championships

T
 Taiwan, see Chinese Taipei Figure Skating Championships
 Turkish Figure Skating Championships
 Thai Figure Skating Championships

U
 Ukrainian Figure Skating Championships
 United States Figure Skating Championships
 United States Junior Figure Skating Championships
 Synchro: U.S. Synchronized Skating Championships
 Collegiate: United States Collegiate Figure Skating Championships
 Intercollegiate: United States Intercollegiate Figure Skating Championships
 Uzbekistani Figure Skating Championships

References 

National championships
 List